Aarch may refer to:
 Aarch (Galactik Football), a character from French series Galactik Football
 AArch64, the 64-bit ARMv8-A execution state
 AArch32, the 32-bit ARMv8-A execution state